Alan Angove Fitcher (25 February 1908 – 26 January 1995) was an Australian rules footballer who played with Fitzroy in the Victorian Football League (VFL).

Fitcher, a ruckman, was born in North Carlton and played at Fitzroy for eight seasons. In 1937, Fitcher was cleared to Brighton, a club he would captain-coach in 1938. He led Brighton to the 1938 VFA Grand Final, which they lost to Brunswick. He crossed to Camberwell in 1939. After the war he became a well known journalist with The Sporting Globe newspaper.

References

1908 births
Australian rules footballers from Melbourne
Fitzroy Football Club players
Brighton Football Club players
Brighton Football Club coaches
Camberwell Football Club players
Australian Army personnel of World War II
Australian sports journalists
1995 deaths
Australian Army soldiers
People from Carlton North, Victoria
Military personnel from Melbourne
Journalists from Melbourne